Petén FC, is a Guatemalan football club based in San Benito, Petén Department.

They play their home games in the Estadio Alejandro Ochaeta Requena.

History
Founded only in 1993 as Deportivo San Benito, they have been playing in the second tier of Guatemalan football since they clinched promotion from the third tier after the 1998/1999 season. They were renamed Petén FC in summer 2010.

Current squad

List of coaches
  Mario Zelaya (1993)
  Julio Gómez (2007–08)

References

Football clubs in Guatemala
Association football clubs established in 1993
Petén Department
1993 establishments in Guatemala